Felix of Bourges (died c. 580) was a bishop of Bourges who later became recognized as a saint.

Relatively few details of Felix's life are known. He is known to have been consecrated bishop by Germain of Paris. He is also known to have taken part in the Council of Paris in 573. We also know of the poem Venantius Fortunatus addressed to Felix regarding a golden pyx which he had had made.

Felix was originally buried in the church of Austregisilus de Castro, outside the city's walls. Popular veneration of him developed quickly. Gregory of Tours relates that twelve years after Felix's death, the stone slab which covered his remains was replaced by a slab of more precious material.

Several miracles were reported as having occurred to those who drank water containing some of the stone dust from the original slab.

References

Sources
 Burns, Paul. Butler's Lives of the Saints:New Full Edition.  Collegeville, MN:The Liturgical Press, 1995. .

Year of birth missing
580 deaths
Bishops of Bourges
6th-century Frankish saints